The North Fork of the Forked Deer River is formed in Gibson County to the south of Chapel Hill Road near Medina and flows to the northwest before entering Dyer County. Here it accepts the flow from the Middle Fork and then joins with the South Fork to form the Forked Deer River.

See also
List of rivers of Tennessee

References

Rivers of Tennessee
Rivers of Dyer County, Tennessee
Bodies of water of Gibson County, Tennessee